Knowllward is a 1928 mansion in the style of a French manor house in Oconomowoc, Wisconsin which was designed by Thomas Van Alyea for Marjorie Montgomery Ward. The home was added to the Architecture and History Inventory of the Wisconsin Historical Society in 1995.

History
The home in Oconomowoc, Wisconsin was designed by Milwaukee-based architect Thomas Van Alyea and Brew City artist George Spinti III, and owned by Marjorie Montgomery Ward Baker: work was completed in 1928. It had  of lake frontage on Oconomowoc's Lac LaBelle. The home is known as Knowllward and it is an example of architecture in the style of a French manor house. It is a  estate with 30 rooms which took the interior designers and other craftsmen 10 months to complete. An addition was built on the home when Marjorie married Robert Baker. The home has 15 bathrooms and 8 bedrooms, with one of the bathrooms featuring a dog bathtub. There is also a garage for four and one half cars. Cyril Colnik was commissioned for the iron work in the home. 

On February 1, 1962, the home became a home for the aged. It was purchased for $300,000 USD and operated by the Lutheran Homes Society. The home was sold to private owners who renovated the mansion in the 1990s. In 1995 the home was added to the Architecture and History Inventory of the Wisconsin Historical Society (WHS) as "800 Lake Rd". The WHS refers to the home as French provincial architecture. In 2017 the Knowllward Mansion was again sold to new owners.

References

Houses completed in 1928
Houses in Wisconsin